Lance Graye McCullers Jr. (born October 2, 1993) is an American professional baseball pitcher for the Houston Astros of Major League Baseball (MLB). The Astros selected McCullers in the first round of the 2012 MLB draft. He made his MLB debut in 2015, and was an All-Star in 2017.

High school
McCullers graduated from Jesuit High School in Tampa, Florida. He was named the Gatorade National Baseball Player of the Year in 2012.

Professional baseball career

Draft and minor leagues

2012–15
The Houston Astros selected McCullers in the first round, with the 41st overall selection, of the 2012 Major League Baseball (MLB) draft. He signed with the Astros, receiving a $2.5 million bonus.

McCullers pitched for the Quad Cities River Bandits of the Class A Midwest League in 2013, winning the Midwest League championship.

For the 2014 season, McCullers was promoted to the Lancaster JetHawks of the Class A-Advanced California League. The JetHawks went on to become the 2014 California League champions after beating the Northern Division champion Visalia Rawhide.

McCullers began the 2015 season with the Corpus Christi Hooks of the Class AA Texas League.  The Astros promoted him to the Fresno Grizzlies of the Triple-A Pacific Coast League on May 14, and, on the following day, announced that he would make his major league debut on May 18.

Houston Astros

2015–16
In his major league debut, McCullers allowed one run, three walks and three hits while striking out five batters in  innings and took a no-decision in the Astros' 2–1 loss to the Oakland Athletics. McCullers threw his first career complete game against the Baltimore Orioles on June 3, 2015. He remained in the Astros rotation and finished with 22 starts.

McCullers began the 2016 season on the disabled list with shoulder soreness. He finished the season 6–5 in 14 starts.

2017
The Astros assigned McCullers to the starting rotation at the outset of 2017 season.  From May 6–23, he delivered 22 scoreless innings, which among Astros pitchers, was the longest scoreless inning streak since Roy Oswalt completed 32 from August 27 through September 11, 2008.  In that same span, McCullers also became the first Astros pitcher since Nolan Ryan in 1984 to allow no earned runs over at least five innings pitched in each of four consecutive appearances.

For the month of May, McCullers won his first American League (AL) Pitcher of the Month Award.  He was credited with a 4–0 record over six starts.  He permitted an AL-leading 0.99 earned run average (ERA), 21 hits, and a .164 batting average against (BAA) with 37 strikeouts.  He also ranked second in wins, third in BAA, and tied for fifth in strikeouts.

The Astros placed McCullers on the disabled list (DL) due to a back injury, and he returned on June 24.  He was selected to the All-Star Game, finishing the first half of the season with a record of 7–2 and 106 strikeouts.  With a recurring back injury, McCullers returned to the DL after July 30, after posting a 7.45 ERA and 1–5 record in between DL stints.

On October 21, 2017, McCullers pitched four scoreless innings in relief and earned his first career save in a 4–0 win over the New York Yankees in Game 7 of the ALCS.  This sent the Astros to their first World Series since 2005 to face the Los Angeles Dodgers. In a key moment in this game, after losing command and walking a batter, he threw 24 consecutive curveballs to retire the last six Yankees in a row. In the World Series, McCullers drew the start in Game 3 and again in Game 7.  The Astros won the Series in the seventh game for the first title in franchise history. In 2020, it was revealed in the Houston Astros sign stealing scandal that the Astros had cheated during their 2017 championship season.

2018–20
McCullers began the 2018 season in the rotation, going 10–6 through 22 starts before landing on the disabled list on August 5 with discomfort in his right elbow. After missing more than a month because of the injury, he returned towards the last two weeks of the regular season in a bullpen role, appearing in three games. He threw a curve 47.4% of the time, tops in MLB.

On November 6, 2018, McCullers underwent Tommy John surgery to repair a torn UCL in his right elbow and was ruled out for the entire 2019 baseball season.  McCullers completed his rehab from Tommy John surgery in early November 2019.

In 2020, McCullers was 3–3 with a 3.93 ERA. He pitched 55 innings with 56 strikeouts in 11 starts.

2021
On March 24, 2021, McCullers and the Astros agreed to a five-year, $85 million contract extension that included a $3.5 million signing bonus. McCullers finished the 2021 season with a 13–5 record, a 3.16 ERA, and 185 strikeouts in  innings over 28 starts.  He led the major leagues with 76 walks and 4.21 walks per 9 innings.  He established new career highs or career bests to that point in his career in numerous categories, including in ERA, games won, games started, strikeouts, innings pitched, batters faced (684), hits per nine innings allowed (H/9, 6.8), and home runs per nine innings (HR/9, 0.7).  Among qualified pitchers, he led the AL in H/9 and HR/9, and ranked second in ERA.

Following the regular season, the Houston chapter of the Baseball Writers' Association of America (BBWAA) named McCullers the Astros' team Pitcher of the Year, his first such award.

During the 2021 ALDS versus the Chicago White Sox, McCullers was removed from Game 4 due to a right forearm injury.  He was unable to participate in the remainder of the playoffs, in the which the Astros reached the World Series, and were defeated by the Atlanta Braves in six games.

2022
Still recovering from the forearm injury, diagnosed a right flexor tendon strain, McCullers was unable to throw in spring training and missed the start of the 2022 season.  On August 13, McCullers made his season debut and earned the win after hurling six shutout innings versus the Oakland Athletics.  He allowed two hits, walked four, and struck out five.  McCullers went  innings on September 2, allowing two runs, six hits, four walks and striking out seven to earn the win in a 4–2 final versus Los Angeles.  He hurled six innings on September 15, issuing four walks, two hits, and two runs as he struck out 11 Athletics, his most since July 29, 2018.  On September 21, McCullers worked seven innings versus his hometown Tampa Bay Rays and was the winning pitcher, allowing two runs to lead the Astros in a 5–2 final score for the series sweep, their first-ever at Tropicana Field.

In 2022, McCullers was 4–2 with a 2.27 ERA in  innings in which he struck out 50 batters in eight starts.

In the third game of the 2022 ALDS, McCullers hurled the first six innings of a major league postseason-record 18-inning shutout and series-clinching sweep of the Mariners.  The game remained scoreless for an unprecedented 17 innings in postseason history—until rookie Jeremy Peña homered in the top of the 18th to eventually win it for the Astros, 1–0.  In Game 3 of the 2022 World Series versus the Philadelphia Phillies, McCullers became the first pitcher in postseason history to allow five home runs in a game.  However, the Astros claimed the championship in six games to give McCullers his second World Series title.

Personal life
His father, Lance McCullers, played in Major League Baseball from 1985 to 1992.

McCullers is a Catholic and spoke about his faith in a video for the Astros' Faith and Family Night in 2015. McCullers married longtime girlfriend Kara Kilfoile in December 2015. Their first child, a daughter, was born in December 2019. In 2016, the Lance McCullers Jr. Foundation, a non-profit organization, was established by McCullers and his family to advocate for stray and homeless animals.

See also

 Houston Astros award winners and league leaders
 List of people from Tampa, Florida
 List of second-generation Major League Baseball players
 List of World Series starting pitchers

References

External links

 

1993 births
Living people
Major League Baseball pitchers
American League All-Stars
Houston Astros players
Gulf Coast Astros players
Greeneville Astros players
Quad Cities River Bandits players
Lancaster JetHawks players
Corpus Christi Hooks players
Fresno Grizzlies players
Sugar Land Skeeters players
Sugar Land Space Cowboys players
Jesuit High School (Tampa) alumni
Baseball players from Tampa, Florida